is a passenger railway station located in Chūō-ku in the city of Sagamihara, Kanagawa Prefecture, Japan, and is operated by the East Japan Railway Company (JR East).

Lines

Station layout
Fuchinobe Station is an elevated station with a single island platform serving two tracks. The station has a Midori no Madoguchi staffed ticket office.

Platforms

History 
Fuchinobe Station was opened on 23 September 1908 on the Yokohama Railway. The Yokohama Railway was nationalized on 1 April 1910 and became part of the Japanese Government Railway (JGR) in 1917. The JGR became the Japan National Railway (JNR) after World War II. All freight operations were discontinued from 1 October 1977. With the privatization of the JNR on 1 April 1987, the station came under the operational control of JR East.

Station numbering was introduced on 20 August 2016 with Fuchinobe being assigned station number JH25.

Passenger statistics
In fiscal 2019, the station was used by an average of 38,106 passengers daily (boarding passengers only).

The passenger figures (boarding passengers only) for previous years are as shown below.

Surrounding area
Aoyama Gakuin University
Obirin University
Sagamihara City Library
Kanuma Park
Yaoko

See also
List of railway stations in Japan

References

External links

Station information page 

Railway stations in Kanagawa Prefecture
Railway stations in Japan opened in 1908
Yokohama Line
Stations of East Japan Railway Company
Railway stations in Sagamihara